Helichrysopsis is a genus of flowering plants in the family Asteraceae, whose only known species is Helichrysopsis septentrionalis, native to KwaZulu-Natal and southern Mozambique.

References

Gnaphalieae
Monotypic Asteraceae genera
Flora of Southern Africa